Jae-woong, also spelled Jae-ung, is a Korean masculine given name.  Its meaning differs based on the hanja used to write each syllable of the name. There are 20 hanja with the reading "jae" and two hanja with the reading "woong" on the South Korean government's official list of hanja which may be used in given names.

People with this name include:
Jae U. Jung (born 1960), South Korean biologist
Han Jae-woong (born 1984), South Korean football winger
Kim Jae-woong (born 1988), South Korean football forward
Lee Jae-woong (sledge hockey) (born 1996), South Korean sledge hockey player
Chung Jae-woong (born 1999), South Korean speed skater
Song Jae-ung, South Korean diver, competed in Diving at the 1964 Summer Olympics – Men's 10 metre platform

See also
List of Korean given names

References

Korean masculine given names